This is an incomplete list of ancient Greek cities, including colonies outside Greece. Note that there were a great many Greek cities in the ancient world. In this list, a city is defined as a single population center. These were often referred to as poleis in the ancient world, these were autonomous city-states, although the list is not limited to poleis but includes also settlements that were not sovereign city-states. Also excluded from the list are larger units, such as kingdoms or empires.

A city is defined as ancient Greek if at any time its population or the dominant stratum within it spoke Greek. Many were soon assimilated to some other language. By analogy some cities are included that never spoke Greek and were not Hellenic, but contributed to Hellenic culture later found in the region.

A

B

C

D

E

G

H

I

J

K

L

M

N

O

P

R

S

T

V

Z

See also 
 Greek colonisation
 Adjectival and demonymic forms of regions in Greco-Roman antiquity
 List of cities in ancient Epirus
 Greek cities in Thrace and Dacia
 Greek cities in Illyria
 Towns of ancient Greece
 List of cities in ancient Acarnania
Regions of ancient Greece

References 

Cities
Lists of cities
Populated places in Greece
Cities in ancient Greece